Thomas Andrew Detwiler (November 24, 1969 – September 21, 2022), also known as Harmless Farmer, was an American farmer who lost both of his arms in an accident as a very young child, and was known for his YouTube videos.

Biography 
Detwiler was born in Urbana, Ohio, the son of a farmer and a middle school teacher. He had a sister and a brother. At the age of two, his paternal grandfather was working on a screw conveyor. Detwiler came up to his grandfather and imitated him, but came too close to the screw conveyor, losing both of his arms and receiving cuts to his face. He was rushed to the hospital.

At the age of nine, Detwiler was recognized by Ace Elliott who worked for the Dayton Daily News, in which Elliott noted that Detwiler could write with his legs. Detwiler attended Salem Elementary School and West Liberty-Salem High School, graduating in 1988.

Detwiler decided to make a YouTube channel on March 3, 2016. His first video, called Welcome to the Farm, was posted on November 1, 2018. He thought of receiving money while making YouTube videos for which he had gained popularity while his channel was receiving views in YouTube. He and his wife, Corkey Wallace, had one child, a daughter, Kylie Detwiler.

In 2020, Detwiler announced that he had been diagnosed with esophageal cancer. He then was afflicted with pneumonia and suffered an aneurysm. His last video was called New Tires For The Oliver 1600, which was posted on September 17, 2022. Detwiler died from the aneurysm on September 21, 2022 in Urbana, Ohio, aged 52.

References 

1969 births
2022 deaths
People from Urbana, Ohio
Farmers from Ohio
Deaths from aneurysm
American YouTubers
20th-century American people
21st-century American people